In mathematics, the Chabauty topology is a certain topological structure introduced in 1950 by Claude Chabauty, on the set of all closed subgroups of a locally compact group G. 

The intuitive idea may be seen in the case of the set of all lattices in a Euclidean space E. There these are only certain of the closed subgroups: others can be found by in a sense taking limiting cases or degenerating a certain sequence of lattices. One can find linear subspaces or discrete groups that are lattices in a subspace, depending on how one takes a limit. This phenomenon suggests that the set of all closed subgroups carries a useful topology.

This topology can be derived from the Vietoris topology construction, a topological structure on all non-empty subsets of a space. More precisely, it is an adaptation of the Fell topology construction, which itself derives from the Vietoris topology concept.

References
 Claude Chabauty, Limite d'ensembles et géométrie des nombres. Bulletin de la Société Mathématique de France, 78 (1950), p. 143-151

Topological groups